Nga-kahu-whero  (–1836?) was a New Zealand Te Rarawa founding mother. She was a ruling chief of the Te Rarawa from circa 1800 until her death. She participated in the Battle of Waitukupahau, the Battle of d Te Oneroa-a-Tohe and the Battle of Moetara in 1833.

References

1836 deaths
Te Rarawa people
Year of birth unknown
19th-century women rulers
Women in 19th-century warfare
Women in war in Oceania